This article is about marriage between a Japanese and a non-Japanese in accordance with the formalities provided by the law of Japan or of a foreign land. Procedures and rules mentioned in this article are mainly those of Japan, but in some cases other requirements are imposed by the homeland of the non-Japanese spouse, or by the foreign land where the concerned couple marry.

In general
The legality of a marriage for each spouse is determined by the homeland law of the spouse.

History
Marriage between a Japanese national and a non-Japanese person was first officially permitted by act of law on March 14, 1873 (6th year of the Meiji Period). This day is informally known as International Marriage Day (国際結婚の日) and coincides with the modern White Day.

Entering law before the former Meiji Constitution (1889) and the former Nationality Law (1899), international marriage at the time required both a permit and surrender of recognised social standing (分限).

During 1986 to 1991, the period of Japanese bubble economy, labor shortages for "3D jobs" (dirty, dangerous, and demeaning) occurred in Japan. This situation created expand the migrant labor rates. However, the revised policy in 1990 prohibited unrestricted economic activities except for only four kinds of visa, which include the "Spouse or child of a Japanese national". This policy legalizes all kinds of economic activity for marriage migrations.

Homeland law
According to an Act of Japan on general rules, 
The homeland law of a person is the law of the country of citizenship of the person.
If a person has more than one citizenship, and if one of the citizenships is Japan, the homeland law is the law of Japan;
If a person has more than one citizenship, and none of them is Japanese, the homeland law of the person is the law of the country where the person habitually lives.
as to a concerned person with nationality of a nation in which laws are different according to locality (like the US), the homeland law is the local law under rules of the nation or, if the nation doesn't have such rules, the homeland law is the law of the local area which is most closely related to the person.

Required translation
Each paper, document mentioned in this article as required by Japan, if not written in Japanese, needs to be accompanied with translation into Japanese; one of the concerned persons can themself be the translator; their name must accompany the translation.

Legal documents
When a Japanese and a non-Japanese are intending to marry  
in accordance with Japanese rules, homeland certification is required regarding the concerned non-Japanese that they are permitted to marry (see the related section below);
in accordance with foreign law, certification by Japan may also be required.

Japanese regulations

Notification
If a couple including a Japanese citizen marry in Japan, the marriage is to be in accordance with Japanese law. 
Thus Japan requires notification of the marriage. 
Japan's diplomatic establishments abroad can not legally accept a notification of a marriage of this type.

Competence certification as to the concerned non-Japanese
Japan requires competence certification as to the concerned non-Japanese, as a paper in principle, to be submitted; if the homeland (state / nation) is one which doesn't issue this certification, 
if he / she swears in the presence of the homeland's consul in Japan that he / she has legal competence under the homeland law to get married with a Japanese, the written oath signed by the consul might be the substitute for this certification paper;
if even the substitutes can not be submitted, a copy of the homeland law on marriage with its source clarified, and identity certification(s) issued by the homeland's official institution(s) such as a passport, are required instead.

Family register
The fact the Japanese got married with the non-Japanese is to be recorded in a family register with the concerned Japanese written at its head; if the Japanese is one not written at the head, a new family register for the concerned couple is to be created.

Family name
While a rule of Japan for the common surname (i.e. family name) is not applied to the couple, the concerned Japanese can change his or her surname to that of the concerned non-Japanese spouse by filing notification as such. This notification, if not within 6 months of the day the marriage became effective, needs permission in advance from a family court.

International marriages in accordance with foreign legislation

Competence certification as to the concerned Japanese
If competence certification as to the concerned Japanese is required, the Japanese can request this certification as a paper
this certification paper is called  in Japanese.

Certification as to the marriage
By a delivery of an authorized copy of certification as to the marriage issued by the foreign land (state / nation), the marriage is regarded under law of Japan as one in accordance with the formality of the foreign land. As the additional required documents, Japanese government requires foreigners(non-Japanese citizen) to provide a sworn Affidavit of Competency to Marry, which is issued by their original country's embassy.

Approve Marriage 
All marriages must be registed at a Japanese municipal government office. One common mistake is that consular officers has no legal rights for marriage registration, neither does the religious or fraternal bodies in Japan.

Notification 
Japan requires the authorized copy of certification as to the marriage 
within 3 months of the day the marriage got effective; when the authorized copy of certification is legally accepted, the fact the Japanese got married with the non-Japanese is to be recorded in the family register of the concerned Japanese.'

National Identity

Korean-Japanese 
After marriage, most of the Korean residents would still treat themselves as ethnically Korean, but no direct relation to North or South Korean anymore. Obtaining a pure Japanese nationality would not become a betrayal to Korean identity.

Filipino-Japanese 
Filipino(language) consists most of the identity issue. Children inside Filipino-Japanese family are usually required to learn Filipino, Japanese and English, with purpose of communicating with Filipino relatives, daily communication(live in Japan) and exploring the international world. The identity of being "doubles"(both Japanese and Filipino) is expected on a child.

Marriage and Divorce Trends (new)

Marriage(2007-2013) 
Since 2007, the intermarriage rate (including "one of couple is foreigner") has decreased, from 5.6% (2007) to 3.2% (2013). Specifically, the rate of "Japanese groom and foreign bride" decreased from 4.4% to 2.3%. The rate of "Japanese bride and foreign groom" decreased from 1.2% to 0.9%.

Divorce(2009-2013) 
Since 2009, the divorce rate among international couples(including "one of couple is foreigner") has decreased from 7.6% (2009) to 6.5% (2013). In the sub-category of "Japanese husband and foreign wife", the divorce rate even lowered from 6.1% to 5.1%, while the rate among "Japanese wife and foreign husband" slightly decreased, from 1.5% to 1.4%.

See also
 Family marriage law in Japan
 International child abduction in Japan
 Asian migrant brides in Japan, a social and local government-led initiative involving the importation of women from other Asian countries

References

External links
The Japan Children's Rights Network

Japanese family law
Marriage, unions and partnerships in Japan
International marriage
Foreign relations of Japan